Helmut Hediger (born 3 May 1945) is an Austrian sprint canoeist who competed in the late 1960s and early 1970s. He won a silver medal in the K-4 1000 m event at the 1966 ICF Canoe Sprint World Championships in East Berlin.

Hediger also competed in two Summer Olympics, earning his best finish of seventh twice (K-2 1000 m: 1972, K-4 1000 m: 1968).

References

1945 births
Austrian male canoeists
Canoeists at the 1968 Summer Olympics
Canoeists at the 1972 Summer Olympics
Living people
Olympic canoeists of Austria
ICF Canoe Sprint World Championships medalists in kayak